Canhestros is a former civil parish in the municipality of Ferreira do Alentejo, Portugal. In 2013, the parish merged into the new parish Ferreira do Alentejo e Canhestros.

References

Former parishes of Ferreira do Alentejo